Daphne Akhurst defeated Esna Boyd 1–6, 8–6, 6–4, in the final to win the women's singles tennis title at the 1925 Australasian Championships.

Seeds
The seeded players are listed below. Daphne Akhurst is the champion; others show the round in which they were eliminated.

 Sylvia Harper (semifinals)
 Daphne Akhurst (champion)
 Esna Boyd (finalist)
 Kathleen Le Messurier (first round)
 Marjorie Cox (quarterfinals)
 Minnie Richardson (semifinals)

Draw

Key
 Q = Qualifier
 WC = Wild card
 LL = Lucky loser
 r = Retired

Finals

Earlier rounds

Section 1

Section 2

External links
 1925 Australian Championships on ITFtennis.com, the source for this draw

1925 in women's tennis
Women's Singles
1925 in Australian women's sport